Radu Nunweiller (born 16 November 1944) is a former Romanian central midfield football player and manager.

Club career
Radu Nunweiller was born in Bucharest on 16 November 1944. He had an Austrian father named Johann Nunweiller, who settled in Piatra Neamț after World War II where he met his wife, Rozina, later they moved from Piatra Neamț to Bucharest. He had six brothers, the oldest one of them, Constantin was a water polo player and the other five: Dumitru, Ion, Lică, Victor and Eduard were footballers, each of them having at least one spell at Dinamo București, they are the reason why the club's nickname is "The Red Dogs". Radu made his Divizia A debut, playing for Viitorul București on 21 October 1962 in a 4–2 loss against Steaua București. After playing only one Divizia A match for Viitorul București, Nunweiller went to play for Dinamo București where he would spend most of his career, winning five Divizia A titles and two Cupa României, also appearing in 22 matches in which he scored 7 goals in European Cup competitions. Radu Nunweiller ended his career after playing three seasons for Corvinul Hunedoara, having a total of 333 appearances and 40 goals scored in Divizia A.

International career

Radu Nunweiller played 41 matches and scored 2 goals for Romania (42/2 including Romania's Olympic team games), making his debut on 21 September 1966 under coach Ilie Oană in a friendly which ended with a 2–0 loss against East Germany. He played one game at the 1968 Euro qualifiers and three games at the successful 1970 World Cup qualifiers, also being used by coach Angelo Niculescu in all the minutes of the three group matches from the final tournament as Romania did not advance to the next stage. He played 9 matches and scored one goal at the 1972 Euro qualifiers, managing to reach the quarter-finals where Romania was defeated by Hungary, who advanced to the final tournament. Nunweiller played 5 games and scored one goal at the 1974 World Cup qualifiers, two games at the Euro 1976 qualifiers where he made his last appearance for the national team on 17 April 1975 in a 1–1 against Spain.

For representing his country at the 1970 World Cup, Nunweiller was decorated by President of Romania Traian Băsescu on 25 March 2008 with the Ordinul "Meritul Sportiv" – (The Medal "The Sportive Merit") class III.

International goals
Scores and results list Romania's goal tally first, score column indicates score after each Nunweiller goal.

Managerial career
After he ended his playing career in 1979, Nunweiller ran away from Romania's communist regime, at that time running away from the country being illegal, going to Switzerland where he worked as manager and assistant manager at various clubs. He obtained a promotion to the Swiss Super League with Yverdon-Sport, had a short experience in the 2002–03 Divizia A season, consisting of 7 games (2 victories, 1 draw, 4 losses) with UTA Arad, also being Neuchâtel Xamax's manager in a 2010–11 Swiss Super League game which ended with a 4–1 loss against FC Basel.

Honours

Player
Dinamo București
Divizia A: 1963–64, 1964–65, 1970–71, 1972–73, 1974–75
Cupa României: 1963–64, 1967–68

Manager
Yverdon-Sport
Swiss Challenge League: 2004–05

Notes

References

External links

1944 births
Living people
Footballers from Bucharest
Romanian footballers
Romanian people of Austrian descent
Olympic footballers of Romania
Romania international footballers
Romanian football managers
Romanian expatriate football managers
Liga I players
CS Corvinul Hunedoara players
FC Dinamo București players
Association football midfielders
1970 FIFA World Cup players
FC Martigny-Sports managers
FC Lausanne-Sport managers
Romanian expatriate sportspeople in Switzerland
Expatriate football managers in Switzerland
Étoile Carouge FC managers
Yverdon-Sport FC managers
Neuchâtel Xamax FCS managers
FC UTA Arad managers
Romanian defectors